Nocturne 29 (Spanish:Nocturno 29) is a 1968 Spanish drama film directed by Pere Portabella and starring Lucia Bosè.

Cast
 Lucia Bosé 
 Mario Cabré 
 Ramón Julia 
 Luis Ciges 
 Antoni Tàpies
 Antonio Saura

References

Bibliography 
 Moliterno, Gino. The A to Z of Italian Cinema. Scarecrow Press, 2009.

External links 
 

1968 films
1968 drama films
Spanish drama films
1960s Spanish-language films
Films directed by Pere Portabella
1960s Spanish films